Der Staatsanwalt hat das Wort ("The state prosecutor has the floor") was an East German television series.

See also 
 List of German television series

External links
 

German crime television series
1965 German television series debuts
1991 German television series endings
1970s German television series
1980s German television series
German-language television shows
Television in East Germany